Quiring may refer to:
 Quiring Township, Beltrami County, Minnesota
 Christopher Quiring (born 1990), German footballer
 Heinrich Quiring (1883–1964), German paleontologist and geologist